This article is about the particular significance of the year 1849 to Wales and its people.

Incumbents

Lord Lieutenant of Anglesey – Henry Paget, 1st Marquess of Anglesey 
Lord Lieutenant of Brecknockshire – John Lloyd Vaughan Watkins
Lord Lieutenant of Caernarvonshire – Peter Drummond-Burrell, 22nd Baron Willoughby de Eresby 
Lord Lieutenant of Cardiganshire – William Edward Powell
Lord Lieutenant of Carmarthenshire – George Rice, 3rd Baron Dynevor 
Lord Lieutenant of Denbighshire – Robert Myddelton Biddulph   
Lord Lieutenant of Flintshire – Sir Stephen Glynne, 9th Baronet
Lord Lieutenant of Glamorgan – Christopher Rice Mansel Talbot (from 4 May)
Lord Lieutenant of Merionethshire – Edward Lloyd-Mostyn, 2nd Baron Mostyn
Lord Lieutenant of Monmouthshire – Capel Hanbury Leigh
Lord Lieutenant of Montgomeryshire – Charles Hanbury-Tracy, 1st Baron Sudeley
Lord Lieutenant of Pembrokeshire – Sir John Owen, 1st Baronet
Lord Lieutenant of Radnorshire – John Walsh, 1st Baron Ormathwaite

Bishop of Bangor – Christopher Bethell 
Bishop of Llandaff – Edward Copleston (until 14 October); Alfred Ollivant (from 2 December) 
Bishop of St Asaph – Thomas Vowler Short 
Bishop of St Davids – Connop Thirlwall

Events
2 January – Completion of both tubes of Robert Stephenson's Conwy Railway Bridge.
26 February – Halkyn-born Mormon missionary Dan Jones embarks with 249 Welsh converts to the Church of Jesus Christ of Latter-day Saints bound for Salt Lake City from Liverpool.
13 May – A case of cholera is recorded in Cardiff, the beginning of an outbreak that spreads to Merthyr, Dowlais and Aberdare, and kills 800 people.
20 June – First tube of Robert Stephenson's Britannia Bridge is floated into position on the Menai Strait.
10 August – Underground explosion at Lletty Shenkin colliery, Cwmbach, kills 52.
1 November – Alfred Ollivant becomes Bishop of Llandaff.
13 December – Foundation stone of Llandovery College is laid.
A temperance festival is held at Carmarthen.

Arts and literature

Awards
David Griffith (Clwydfardd) is appointed official bard of the Aberffraw eisteddfod. Rowland Williams (Hwfa Môn) is also invested as a bard.

New books

English language
Anne Beale – Traits and Stories of the Welsh Peasantry
Lady Charlotte Guest concludes publication of her translation into English of the Mabinogion
John Lloyd – The English Country Gentleman
Samuel Lewis – Topographical Dictionary of Wales
Thomas Stephens – The Literature of the Kymry

Welsh language
Robert Elis (Cynddelw) – Yr Adgyfodiad
Hugh Derfel Hughes – Y Gweithiwr Caniadgar
Rowland Hughes – Cyfarchiad Caredig i rai newydd ddychwelyd
John Jones (Talhaiarn) – Awdl y Greadigaeth

Music
Haleliwia (hymns)

Births
2 May – Charles James Jackson, businessman and collector (d. 1923)

Deaths
14 August – Edward Copleston, Bishop of Llandaff, 73
16 September – Thomas Jones, missionary, 39
2 October – James Davies, schoolmaster, 83
2 November – Jacob Davies, missionary, 33
5 December – Walter Davies (Gwallter Mechain), poet, 88

References

 
Wales